The Teatro Valle-Inclán is a theatre in Madrid, Spain. Together with Teatro María Guerrero, it is the home of the Spanish Centro Dramático Nacional. It is located at plaza de Lavapiés, in the city centre, and opened in February 2006.

Architects Ángela García de Paredes and Ignacio García Pedrosa received the 2007 Spanish Architecture Award for its design.

References

External links
 Centro Dramático Nacional official website

Entertainment venues in Madrid
Theatres in Madrid
Buildings and structures in Embajadores neighborhood, Madrid